Take My Wife can refer to several television productions, typically inspired by Henny Youngman's famous one-liner, "Take my wife, please"
 Now Take My Wife, a 1971 BBC television sitcom
 Take My Wife (1979 TV series), a 1979 British television sitcom
 "Take My Wife, Please" (Married... with Children episode), the 1993 seventh episode of the eighth season of the American sitcom Married... with Children
 "Take My Wife, Sleaze", the 1999 eighth episode of the eleventh season of the American animated sitcom The Simpsons
 "Take My Wife, Please", the 2004 thirteenth episode of the eleventh season of NYPD Blue
 "Take My Wife" (Family Guy), the 2015 eighteenth episode of the thirteenth season of the American animated sitcom Family Guy
 Take My Wife (2016 TV series), a 2016 comedy series